Christopher Rungkat was the defending champions having won the event in 2011, but lost in the quarterfinals to Jeson Patrombon.

Warit Sornbutnark won the gold medal, defeating David Susanto in the final, 4–6, 6–3, 6–3. Patrombon and Bun Kenny won the bronze medals.

Medalists

Seeds

Draw

Finals

Top half

Bottom half

External links
Draw

Men's Singles